Mitch Ronald Messier (born August 21, 1965) is a Canadian former professional ice hockey player who played 20 games in the National Hockey League.  He played with the Minnesota North Stars between 1987 and 1991. He played at Michigan State University from 1983-1987.

Mitch is the brother of Joby Messier and a cousin of Hockey Hall of Fame member Mark Messier.

Career statistics

Regular season and playoffs

Awards and honours

References

External links
 

1965 births
Living people
AHCA Division I men's ice hockey All-Americans
Canadian ice hockey right wingers
EC KAC players
Fort Wayne Komets players
Kalamazoo Wings (1974–2000) players
Michigan State Spartans men's ice hockey players
Milwaukee Admirals (IHL) players
Minnesota North Stars draft picks
Minnesota North Stars players
Ice hockey people from Saskatchewan
NCAA men's ice hockey national champions
Sportspeople from Regina, Saskatchewan
Canadian expatriate ice hockey players in the United States
Canadian expatriate ice hockey players in Austria